Bull, The Bull, and Da Bull are nicknames.

Those so named include:
Nicknamed "Bull" unless otherwise noted.
 Bill Adams (1900–1973), Australian rules footballer
 Donnis Churchwell (born 1936), American former National Football League player
 Bull Connor (1897–1973), American politician infamous for opposing desegregation in Birmingham, Alabama, in the 1960s
 Johnny Davis (born 1956), American former National Football League player
 Ed Durham (1907–1976), American baseball pitcher
 Leon Durham (born 1957), American baseball first baseman
 Sammy Gravano (born 1945), former underboss of the Gambino crime family nicknamed "the Bull"
 David Gurfein, United States Marine Corps lieutenant colonel, and CEO of nonprofit organization United American Patriots
 William Halsey Jr. (1882–1959), United States Navy fleet admiral
 Terry Jenkins (born 1963), English darts player nicknamed "The Bull"
 Brooks Lawrence (1925–2000), American Negro National League and Major League Baseball pitcher
 Greg Luzinski (born 1950), American Major League Baseball outfielder and designated hitter
 Frank McCaffrey (1888–1952), American college football player and 1917 head football coach of Fordham University
 Bull Montana (1887–1950), American professional wrestler and actor 
 William "Bull" Nelson (1824–1862), United States Army major-general during the American Civil War, and United States Navy officer prior to the war
 Greg Noll (1937–2021), American surfing pioneer nicknamed "Da Bull"
 Bull Polisky (1901–1978), American football player
 Alan Richardson (footballer, born 1940) (1940–2015), Australian footballer
 Franz Roth (born 1946), German former footballer nicknamed "the Bull"
 Edwin Vose Sumner (1797–1863), American Civil War Union Army general
 Tsang Kin-shing (born 1957), Hong Kong politician

See also
 Raging Bull (disambiguation), includes a list of people with the nickname
 Luis Ángel Firpo (1894–1960), Argentine boxer nicknamed "The Wild Bull of The Pampas"
 Johnny Hoogerland (born 1983), Dutch cyclist nicknamed the "Bull of Beveland"
 Hakan Şükür (born 1971), Turkish retired footballer nicknamed the "Bull of the Bosphorus"
 El Toro (nickname), Spanish for "the Bull"
 David Jones (rugby, born 1881) (1881–1933), Welsh rugby union and rugby league footballer nicknamed "Tarw" (Welsh for "Bull")
 
 

Lists of people by nickname